Assumed to have been written in 1424, La Belle Dame sans Mercy is a French poem on courtly love written by Alain Chartier.

Versification
The poem is written in a series of octaves (huitains in the French) each line of which contains eight syllables (octosyllabes), which is also the style of the poet François Villon in the "Ballade des dames du temps jadis" written later in the 15th century. In the debate between the Lover and the Lady, the alternating octaves delineate their arguments.

The rhyme scheme is ABABBCBC of crossed rhymes (rimes croisées).

Structure
The body of La Belle Dame sans Mercy is composed of 100 stanzas of alternating dialogue between a male lover and the lady he loves (referred to in the French as l'Amant et la Dame). Their dialogue is framed by the observations of the narrator-poet who is mourning the recent death of his lady.

The first 24 stanzas describe the mourning poet, the self-described most unhappy lover ("le plus dolent des amoureux"), as he embarks alone on horseback, driven to wander by Sadness (Tristesse) and divested of his capacity to feel by Death (Mort).  After wandering for a time, the narrator-poet finds himself obliged to attend a party with two of his friends. It is at this party that the poet observes the unhappy lover, with whom he can empathize, and his lady.  At the end of the twenty-fourth stanza, the narrator-poet takes on the role of silent observer, hiding himself behind a trellis. He listens to and then claims to transcribe the conversation between the melancholy lover and the lady. The lover, in traditional love language, offers multiple reasons for the lady to accept him as her lover; the lady refuses to acquiesce in witty and reasoned ripostes.  In the last four stanzas the poet-narrator takes over the narrative to give the moral of the poem.

Editions
 Alain Chartier, Baudet Herenc and Achille Caulier, Le Cycle de la Belle Dame sans Mercy : une anthologie poétique du XVe siècle (BNF MS FR. 1131), Edition bilingue établie, traduite, présentée et annotée par David F. Hult et Joan E. McRae. Paris : Champion, 2003.
 Alain Chartier, Alain Chartier: The Quarrel of the Belle Dame sans Mercy. Ed. and trans. Joan E. McRae. New York: Routledge, 2004.

References

Medieval French literature
French poems
15th-century poems
Alain Chartier